The pulwar or pulouar is a single-handed curved sword originating in Afghanistan.

Origin
The pulwar originated alongside other scimitar-type weapons such as the Arab saif, the Persian shamshir, the Turkish kilij, and the Indian talwar, all of them ultimately based on earlier Central Asian swords. Originally, the Khyber Knife (a type of short sword) served as the weapon of the common people while upper-classes could afford to import swords from neighbouring Persia and India. Over time, the Afghans combined characteristics of the imported swords and adapted it to create the pulwar. Most existing pulwars date back to the early 19th century.

Characteristics

Borrowing features from the swords of neighboring lands, the pulwar may be described as an Afghan version of the Indian talwar. Pulwar blades tend to be more elaborately fullered than those of the talwar. Some pulwar hilts were fitted to Persian blades which are slimmer and more curved and tapered towards the tip than the more typically robust pulwar blades. The hilt is characterized by two quillons which are short and turned to point in the direction of the blade in the manner of some shamshir and saif, a feature typical of swords produced in Qajar period Iran. Like the tulwar, the hilt is made of iron, and is attached to the tang of the blade by a very strong adhesive resin. Unlike the flat disc surrounding  the pommel of the tulwar, the pommel of pulwar exhibits a cup-shape. Both hilt and blade can be ornately engraved with inscriptions, designs, and images.

See also
 Khanjar
 Sabre
 Zulfiqar

Notes

References
 Evangelista, N. and Gaugler, W. M. (1995). The encyclopedia of the sword. Greenwood Publishing Group. .

Weapons of Afghanistan
Single-edged swords
Pashtun culture